Klaiber is a surname of German origin. Notable people with the surname include:

Jeff Klaiber (born 1962), American speed skater
Reese Klaiber, Canadian country music artist
Sean Klaiber (born 1994), Dutch footballer
Walter Klaiber (born 1940), German theologian and bishop of the Evangelical Methodist Church

References

Surnames of German origin